The Leonhard Schultze (Leonard Schultze) or Walio–Papi languages are a proposed family of about 6 Papuan languages spoken in the Sepik river basin of northern Papua New Guinea. They are spoken along the border region of East Sepik Province and Sandaun Province, just to the south of the Iwam languages.

The languages are named after the Leonhard Schultze River, which is in turn named after German anthropologist Leonhard Schultze-Jena.

Languages
The Leonard Schultze languages are:

Walio languages: Walio, Pei, Yawiyo, and Tuwari
Papi–Asaba languages: Papi and Suarmin

Classification
The Leonhard Schultze languages were traditionally classified by Laycock and Z'graggen (1975) as part of the Sepik language family.

Foley (2018) classifies the Leonhard Schultze languages separately as an independent language family rather than as part of the Sepik languages (as in previous classifications proposed by others). However, this classification is not accepted by Glottolog, which splits up the Walio and Papi branches and considers them each to be a primary language family.

Vocabulary comparison
The following basic vocabulary words are from Conrad and Dye (1975), as cited in the Trans-New Guinea database:

{| class="wikitable sortable"
! gloss !! Walio !! Yawiyo (Wosawari dialect) !! Papi
|-
! head
| tiᵽo || tipafu || auwiyu
|-
! hair
| tiřeʔ || yei || ařupisi
|-
! ear
| aᵽoᵽo || afe || mʌgʌnaba
|-
! eye
| nogub̶ʌnɛ || nimau || sunweyo
|-
! nose
| tʌᵽsɛᵽoʔ || tɩmʌsi || tʌnipɔku
|-
! tooth
| nʌᵽaᵽala || nʌfe || sʋmunu
|-
! tongue
| nʌgʌya || tanotai || sakeyo
|-
! louse
| natʌᵽi || dibafuyei || ařupɩsɩ
|-
! dog
| kauwaᵽo || ifau; ivau || agabu
|-
! pig
| taǏib̶o || ami ami || tʌmaub̶o
|-
! bird
|  || auma || ɔb̶ɔ; ɔːsani
|-
! egg
| naᵽu || aumufu || usouyo
|-
! blood
| liʔ || teyuowa || taneke
|-
! bone
| ipalib̶o || ihuwa || naikʌmio
|-
! skin
| aᵽayo || toefahewa || pʌsiyæ
|-
! breast
| matʌᵽulo || mama || abiyaiɔ
|-
! tree
| biᵽoʔ || yanu || naːb̶ʌkʌ
|-
! man
| ɛlɛgobuwo || to; to iːwa || sanoᵽo
|-
! woman
| tɔkotʌb̶isia || sauto || suːbu
|-
! water
| ǥwei || utlauwe || ařukowa
|-
! fire
| linati || tanuwa; tiyami || řiku
|-
! stone
| ᵽuboʔ || tab̶iya || tab̶iyaio
|-
! road, path
| ʔɛᵽobu || efʌmowa || pʌbřiyaio
|-
! eat
| kanab̶o || afaʔunařu || opo akepo
|-
! one
| aǏia gʌǏaǏilau || ařʌsʌbau || sunuboku
|-
! two
| ǥuřaǥaʔ || ařʌfři || suwʌbiyaio
|}

References

 
Sepik languages
Languages of Momase Region